Mount Du (Chinese: 独山; Pinyin: Dú Shān), which means Lonely Hill in Chinese, is a small mountain near Nanyang City, Henan province, China.

Mine 
The hill is rich in a jade substitute or simulant stone, saussurite. "Dushan jade" is a misnomer.  It is not the true jade found  in Xinjiang, China: nephrite, a CaMg silicate (Si), nor the true jade found in Burma: jadeite, a NaAl silicate (Si).  It is a fine grained mixture of feldspar and epidote.  It is currently marketed under the names, Dushan jade, Swiss jade (1st identified by Swiss mineralogist), and Nanyang jade (Nanyang, Henan Province).

Local Culture 
On the third day of the third month of the Chinese calendar, people climb the mountain.

References
China Jade - The 10th paragraph has an introduction.

Du